Mette Bjerg (born 24 February 1976) is a Danish retired midfielder who played for Vejle BK, Horsens SIK and Denmark national team.

International career

Bjerg was also part of the Danish team at the 2005 European Championships.

References

1976 births
Danish women's footballers
Denmark women's international footballers
Women's association football goalkeepers
Living people